Bin Yu is a Chinese-American statistician. She is currently Chancellor's Professor in the Departments of Statistics and of Electrical Engineering & Computer Sciences at the University of California, Berkeley.

Biography
Yu earned a bachelor's degree in mathematics in 1984 from Peking University, and went on to pursue graduate studies in statistics at Berkeley, earning a master's degree in 1987 and a Ph.D. in 1990. Her dissertation, Some Results on Empirical Processes and Stochastic Complexity, was jointly supervised by Lucien Le Cam and Terry Speed.

After postdoctoral studies at the Mathematical Sciences Research Institute and an assistant professorship at the University of Wisconsin–Madison, she returned to Berkeley as a faculty member in 1993, was tenured in 1997, and became Chancellor's Professor in 2006. She also worked at Bell Labs from 1998 to 2000, while on leave from Berkeley, and has held visiting positions at several other universities. She chaired the Department of Statistics at Berkeley from 2009 to 2012, and was president of the Institute of Mathematical Statistics in 2014.

Research 

Yu's work leverages computational developments to solve scientific problems by combining statistical machine learning approaches with the domain expertise of many collaborators, spanning many fields including statistics, machine learning, neuroscience, genomics, and remote sensing. Her recent work has focused on solidifying a vision for data science, including a framework for veridical data science and a framework for interpretable machine learning. Yu has also developed a PCS (predictability, computability, and stability) framework for veridical data science to unify, streamline and expand on ideas and best practices of machine learning and statistics. Yu has received recent news coverage regarding her veridical data science framework, investigations into the theoretical foundations of deep learning, and work forecasting COVID-19 severity in the US.

Other research included research in the area of statistical machine learning methods/algorithms (and associated statistical inference problems) such as dictionary learning, non-negative matrix factorization (NMF), EM and deep learning (CNNs and LSTMs), and heterogeneous effect estimation in randomized experiments (X-learner).

Honors and awards
Yu is a fellow of the Institute of Mathematical Statistics, the IEEE, the American Statistical Association, the American Association for the Advancement of Science, the American Academy of Arts and Sciences, and the National Academy of Sciences. In 2012, she was the Tukey Lecturer of the Bernoulli Society for Mathematical Statistics and Probability. In 2018, she was awarded the Elizabeth L. Scott Award. She was invited to give the Breiman lecture at NeurIPS 2019 (formally known as NIPS), on the topic of veridical data science.

References

External links
 A conversation with Professor Bin Yu By Tao Shi, July 9, 2013

Year of birth missing (living people)
Living people
American women statisticians
Chinese statisticians
Chinese women mathematicians
Chinese mathematicians
Peking University alumni
UC Berkeley College of Letters and Science alumni
UC Berkeley College of Engineering faculty
University of Wisconsin–Madison faculty
Fellow Members of the IEEE
Fellows of the American Academy of Arts and Sciences
Fellows of the American Association for the Advancement of Science
Presidents of the Institute of Mathematical Statistics
Members of the United States National Academy of Sciences
Fellows of the Institute of Mathematical Statistics
Fellows of the American Statistical Association
Mathematicians from Heilongjiang
Educators from Heilongjiang
People from Harbin
21st-century American women
Mathematical statisticians